Maurice Block; 18 February 18169 January 1901) was a German-French statistician and economist.

Block was born in Berlin of Jewish parents. He studied at the University of Bonn and the University of Heidelberg and received his doctorate from the University of Tübingen. In the mid-1840s he moved to Paris to become a statistician with the French ministry of agriculture. In 1853 he moved on to the General Statistic service.

Beginning in 1856, Block edited L'Annuaire de l'economie politique et de la statistique.  He remained the editor until 1901.  Block, along with many French economists of his time, believed that economics was too complex of a subject to be amenable to mathematical techniques.

He retired in 1862 and thenceforth wrote predominantly on the topics of agriculture, finance and public administration, turning to criticism of socialism in the 1890s. A prolific writer, he was published in a number of academic and professional magazines and journals of the time. He continued to devote himself to statistical studies as well.

He was elected a member of the Académie des Sciences Morales et Politiques in 1880. He died in Paris on 9 January 1901.

His principal works are: Dictionnaire de l'administration francaise (1856); Statistique de la France  (1860); Dictionnaire general de la politique (1862); L'Europe politique et sociale (1869); Traité theorique et pratique de statistique (1878); Les Progres de l'economie politique depuis Adam Smith (1890); and wrote in German Die Bevolkerung des franzosischen Kaiserreichs (1861); Die Bevalkerung Spaniens and Portugals (1860); and Die Machtstellung der europäischen Staaten (1862).

He wrote several books against socialism : Les théoriciens du socialisme en Allemagne (1872) ; Le socialisme moderne (1890). He is the author of the famous distinction between the three political lines : Orleanism, Legitimism and Bonapartism. As Adolphe Franck and Michel Breal, he is one of those Jewish Scholars who attempted to remain neutral during the Dreyfus affair.

References

 

19th-century German economists
German statisticians
French statisticians
19th-century German Jews
German emigrants to France
Jewish scientists
French Liberal School
French classical liberals
Members of the Académie des sciences morales et politiques
1816 births
1901 deaths
19th-century French  economists